Boo Moon is a 1954 theatrical cartoon short released in 3D format as a Stereotoon. It was produced by Famous Studios for the Stereotoon series featuring Casper the Friendly Ghost and distributed by Paramount Pictures.

Plot 
Casper emerges from a subway station, following a crowd of scared strangers. He encounters a man saying "see the wonders of the Moon for ten cents," and offering a sight through a telescope. Casper scares the man away, then uses the telescope to see the Moon. He then flies to the Moon for a visit. Casper lands on the Moon, disappointed to find no man on the Moon. He lies down to nap, then tiny Moon men emerge from holes. They capture Casper, lock him in a cage, and tow him to King Luna. The King addresses Casper as a monster and treats him as an enemy. Casper playfully picks him up, only to be placed in the royal dungeon. Then, tree monsters attack. The Moon Men defend their fortified city with flaming missiles. The tree monsters fight back with water, then break through the town walls. Casper escapes his cage, and helps the Moon Men by going underground and tying the trees' root feet together so they can't attack. After the Moon Men win the battle, King Luna knights Casper for the valiant defense of his people.

Voice cast 
 Cecil Roy voices Casper
 Jackson Beck voices King Luna, Moon People
 Sid Raymond voices Barker
 Allen Swift voices Lookout Character(s)
 Jack Mercer voices Moon People
 Additional Voices are provided by Alan Shay

Production 
This is the second Paramount cartoon released in 3D format. The first one was Popeye, the Ace of Space released on 2 October 1953 in the Popeye the Sailor series. The 2-D print of Boo Moon was released on March 5, 1954. The opening sequence 

There's Good Boos To-Night is seen on some public domain copies which is lifted from flat video prints.

References

External links
 
 Boo Moon on official Casper the Friendly Ghost YouTube channel

1954 animated films
1954 short films
1950s animated short films
Animated space adventure films
American space adventure films
1954 comedy films
1953 3D films
American animated short films
Films directed by Isadore Sparber
Moon in film
Casper the Friendly Ghost films
1950s American animated films
American 3D films
American comedy short films
Paramount Pictures short films
3D animated short films
1950s English-language films
Films about trees
American ghost films